Kherkhan is a village de facto in the Martuni Province of the breakaway Republic of Artsakh, de jure in the Khojavend District of Azerbaijan, in the disputed region of Nagorno-Karabakh. The village has an ethnic Armenian-majority population, and also had an Armenian majority in 1989. The village lost 10% of its population as a result of both Nagorno-Karabakh wars.

History 
During the Soviet period, the village was a part of the Martuni District of the Nagorno-Karabakh Autonomous Oblast.

Historical heritage sites 
Historical heritage sites in and around the village include the cemetery of Khacher from between the 11th and 14th centuries, the 19th-century St. George's Church, and a 19th-century spring monument.

Economy and culture 
The population is mainly engaged in agriculture and animal husbandry. As of 2015, the village has a municipal building, a house of culture, a school, and a medical centre.

Demographics 
The village had 111 inhabitants in 2005, and 140 inhabitants in 2015.

Notable people 
 Yakov Melkumov (1885 – 1962), Soviet military commander during the Russian Civil War's fighting against the Basmachi Movement on the Turkestan Front. He is known for commanding the unit that killed Enver Pasha.

References

External links 
 
 

Populated places in Khojavend District
Populated places in Martuni Province